The Naung Mung scimitar babbler (Napothera naungmungensis) is a bird in the family Pellorneidae, described as new to science in 2005. It is sometimes considered conspecific with the closely-related short-tailed scimitar babbler.

The Naung Mung scimitar babbler is found in temperate rainforest on steep, sub-Himalayan hillsides. It was discovered in February 2004 in far northern Myanmar, and is named after the village of Naung Mung, the closest settlement to its discovery site.

It is believed to be fairly common within its range.

References

Collar, N.J. 2011. Taxonomic notes on some Asian babblers (Timaliidae). Forktail number 27: 100–102.
Collar, N. J. & Robson, C. 2007. Family Timaliidae (Babblers)  pp. 70 – 291 in; del Hoyo, J., Elliott, A. & Christie, D.A. eds. Handbook of the Birds of the World, Vol. 12. Picathartes to Tits and Chickadees. Lynx Edicions, Barcelona.
Rappole, John H.; Renner, Swen C.; Shwe, Nay Myo & Sweet, Paul R. (2005): A new species of scimitar-babbler (Timaliidae: Jabouilleia) from the sub-Himalayan region of Myanmar Auk 122(4): 1064–1069. [English with Spanish abstract] DOI:[10.1642/0004-8038(2005)122[1064:ANSOST]2.0.CO;2 HTML abstract

Naung Mung scimitar babbler
Birds of Myanmar
Naung Mung scimitar babbler
Taxobox binomials not recognized by IUCN